Municipal elections were held in the Canadian province of Prince Edward Island on November 5, 2018.

Charlottetown

Mayor

City Council
Candidates for Charlottetown City Council are as follows:

Cornwall

Stratford

Summerside

References

Elections in Prince Edward Island
2018 elections in Canada
Municipal elections in Prince Edward Island
November 2018 events in Canada